"Bang the Drum All Day" is a 1983 song by Todd Rundgren. The lyrics describe, in the first person, the narrator's drive to play drums or improvised percussion to the exclusion of other activities such as work or education. All the instruments on this track are performed by Rundgren. 

Rundgren would re-record the song live for subscribers to his PatroNet service. The new version was retitled "Bang the Ukulele Daily", referring to Rundgren's decision to perform it in a Hawaiian style, accompanied only by a ukulele. "Bang the Ukulele Daily" was included on his album One Long Year.

The song has become popular as an anti-work anthem or anthem of celebration.

In popular culture
The song is played in Lambeau Field after the Green Bay Packers score a touchdown. It was similarly used by the Cincinnati Bengals in the early 2000s and brought back in 2017 as well as by the Indianapolis Colts until being replaced by The Black Keys' "Gold on the Ceiling". The St. Louis Rams also used the song as touchdown celebration music during home games played at the TWA Dome during their Super Bowl-winning 1999 season. In addition to being a touchdown song, the song was used as the goal song for the Edmonton Road Runners during the 2004-05 AHL season whenever they scored a goal at home in Rexall Place.  

The song is used by talk radio host Jim Quinn as his union heads-up theme. Boston talk host Howie Carr also plays a snippet to poke fun at the Occupy Wall Street movement.

The song is referenced in the video game The Elder Scrolls III: Morrowind by a  merchant named Creeper, who says, "Don't want to work. Just want to bang on my drum. What's a scamp gotta do?"

The song was featured in a 1997 commercial for Ericsson entitled "Phone Boss Vacation", where a bunch of workers are shown dancing to the song. They quickly turn it off when a woman answers a phone call from the boss, who is on vacation.

That song is featured in the trailer of the 1998 DreamWorks animated movie Antz, in The Prince of Egypt 1999 VHS opening, and the Shrek 2001 VHS opening.

The song was featured in the trailer and TV spot of the 2008 family movie Nim's Island.

The song is featured on the radio show The Morning Drive on Sirius XM NASCAR Radio, a morning talk show hosted by Mike Bagley and Pete Pistone. The song is used on Friday mornings to celebrate the upcoming weekend. For many years, classic hits station WKLH in Milwaukee played it every Friday at 5 p.m. to signal the end of the work week. WXLP in Moline, Illinois, plays the song every Friday as well during the Dwyer and Michael's morning show as well as WHTZ in New York City every Friday during the Z Morning Zoo.

The song is referenced by Michael Scott in The Office episode "The Fight". The lyrics are changed to "I don't want to work, I just wanna bang on this mug all day".

The song was also featured in commercials for Carnival Cruise Line, which paid Rundgren "ridiculous money to use it". It features in Undercover Burns episode of The Simpsons.

On Magnum P.I., the song is the ringtone Juliet Higgins has assigned to Thomas Magnum.

The song opens the final segment of Friday broadcasts of talk radio's The Dan Patrick Show.

Chart positions

References

Songs about drums
1983 songs
Todd Rundgren songs
History of the Green Bay Packers
Novelty songs
Songs written by Todd Rundgren
Song recordings produced by Todd Rundgren